Yey! (stylized as YeY! or YEY!) was a Philippine children's pay television channel created by ABS-CBN and was one of the freemium channels of ABS-CBN TV Plus. Yey! is the second animation channel of ABS-CBN after Hero TV (defunct), a cable channel owned by ABS-CBN's narrowcast arm Creative Programs. Yey! channel primarily airs Filipino-dubbed Japanese anime series and foreign cartoon shows, along with limited imported programming from ABS-CBN's main channel and Hero TV.

History

Digital free-to-air channel (2011–2020)
Yey! was first known as a digital free-to-air channel that was first launched on January 3, 2011 in test broadcast. On February 11, 2015, Yey! became available on ABS-CBN TV Plus in the digital boxes's channel 4. On June 30, 2020 (July 1 outside Metro Manila), the network closed after the alias cease-and-desist order (ACDO) issued by the National Telecommunications Commission (NTC) and Solicitor General Jose Calida against ABS-CBN TV Plus.

Programming block (2021–present)
On November 6, 2021, Yey! was relaunched as a programming block on Kapamilya Channel, A2Z (under "Kidz Weekend"), and Jeepney TV.

Programming

Anime series and cartoon programs were divided into various programming blocks.

 All Yey! Anime – The channel's flagship primetime block featuring Japanese anime series intended for all audiences. It was aired every Mondays to Fridays from 5:00 pm to 9:00 pm, and on Saturdays and Sundays from 9:00 pm to 10:00 pm.
 Nickelodeon sa Yey! – The channel's daytime block consisting of cartoons from Nickelodeon and Nick Jr. It was aired every Mondays to Sundays from 9:00 am to 1:00 pm.
 Bibolilits – A morning block that airs selected foreign cartoons intended for pre-schoolers and young children. It was aired every Mondays to Sundays from 6:30 am to 8:30 am.
 Ka-Pow! – A weekday afternoon block consisting of foreign cartoons. It was aired every Mondays to Fridays from 1:00 PM to 3:00 PM.
 Power Hour – A weekend afternoon block consisting of selected live-action series, toys-themed anime series, and foreign cartoons. It was aired every Saturdays and Sundays from 1:00 pm to 3:00 pm.
 Fam-Time – An afternoon block consisting of classic anime series (most of them are from the World Masterpiece Theater anime franchise) every weekdays, re-runs of selected ABS-CBN programs every weekends, and channel-produced programs that are considered child-friendly and family-oriented. It was aired Mondays to Sundays from 3:30 pm to 5:00 pm.
 Kid Sine – A weekend movie block that was aired from 5:00 pm to 9:00 pm, featuring classic local films every Saturdays, and Tagalog-dubbed foreign films every Sundays.

See also
ABS-CBN
Hero (defunct)

References

External links

Official Website

ABS-CBN Corporation channels
Anime television
Assets owned by ABS-CBN Corporation
Children's television channels in the Philippines
Creative Programs
Filipino-language television stations
Defunct television networks in the Philippines
Television channels and stations established in 2011
2011 establishments in the Philippines
Children's television networks
Anime and Cartoon television